The 1999–2000 Butler Bulldogs men's basketball team represented Butler University in the 1999–2000 NCAA Division I men's basketball season. Their head coach was Barry Collier, serving in his 11th and final season at the school. The Bulldogs played their home games at Hinkle Fieldhouse as members of the Midwestern Collegiate Conference. Butler finished first in the MCC regular season standings by three games and won the MCC tournament to receive the conference’s automatic bid to the NCAA tournament – the school’s third NCAA Tournament appearance in four years. As No. 12 seed in the East region, and entering play with a 15-game win streak, the Bulldogs were beaten at the buzzer by No. 5 seed Florida, 69–68 in OT, in a game the Gators used as a springboard to an eventual National runner-up finish. Butler finished the season with a record of 23–8 (12–2 MCC).

Roster

Schedule and results

|-
!colspan=9 style=| Regular season

|-
!colspan=9 style=| MCC tournament

|-
!colspan=9 style=| NCAA tournament

References

Butler
Butler Bulldogs men's basketball seasons
Butler
Butler Bulldogs men's basketball
Butler Bulldogs men's basketball